The 1914–15 NCAA men's basketball season began in December 1914, progressed through the regular season, and concluded in March 1915.

Season headlines 

 The Southwest Conference began play, with five original members.
 In February 1943, the Helms Athletic Foundation retroactively selected Illinois as its national champion for the 1914–15 season.
 In 1995, the Premo-Porretta Power Poll retroactively selected Illinois as its national champion for the 1914–15 season.

Conference membership changes

Regular season

Conference winners

Statistical leaders

Awards

Helms College Basketball All-Americans 

The practice of selecting a Consensus All-American Team did not begin until the 1928–29 season. The Helms Athletic Foundation later retroactively selected a list of All-Americans for the 1914–15 season.

Major player of the year awards 

 Helms Player of the Year: Ernest Houghton, Union (NY) (retroactive selection in 1944)

References